This is a list of films set on or around May Day.

Adventure
 First Knight (1995) - American Arthurian adventure film in which Guinevere rides out on May Day

Animated
 Lilo & Stitch 2: Stitch Has a Glitch (2005) - Disney film about a hula competition in a May Day festival
 Howl's Moving Castle (film) (2004) - Studio Ghibli film which begins during a May Day celebration

Comedy
 On the Green Carpet (2001) - North Korean romantic comedy about the May Day mass games

Drama
 The Assassination of Trotsky (1972) - British film that begins with a May Day celebration in Mexico City
 The First of May (1998) - Joe DiMaggio's last film
 Maytime (1923) - American silent romantic drama, based on the Broadway musical
 Maytime (1937) - musical remake of the 1923 film
 The Unbearable Lightness of Being (1988) - American adaptation of the 1984 novel of the same name, featuring a May Day ceremony
 Zero Day (2003) - American film inspired by the Columbine High School massacre

Historical
 Salvatore Giuliano (1962) - Italian film depicting the 1947 May Day massacre of Sicilian communists by gangsters

Horror
 The Wicker Man (1973) - British horror film about a pagan May Day celebration
 The Wicker Man (2006) - American remake of the 1973 film
 The Wicker Tree (2011) - sequel to the 1973 British film
 Midsommar (film) (2019) - American film about May Day rituals in a remote Swedish Commune

Thriller
 Tinker Tailor Soldier Spy (2011) - British Cold War espionage film adaptation of the 1974 John le Carré novel, featuring a May Day celebration in Berlin in 1969

Lists of films set around holidays
May Day